The Military ranks of Guatemala are the military insignia used by the Armed Forces of Guatemala.

Commissioned officer ranks
The rank insignia of commissioned officers.

Other ranks
The rank insignia of non-commissioned officers and enlisted personnel.

References

External links
 

Guatemala
Military of Guatemala